"Meet in the Middle" is a song recorded by American country music band Diamond Rio. It was released in February 1991 as their debut single, and served as the first single in the album Diamond Rio.  The single reached number one on the U.S. Billboard Hot Country Singles & Tracks charts, making Diamond Rio the first country music band in history to have its debut single reach number one.  The song was written by Don Pfrimmer, Chapin Hartford and Jim Foster.

Content
"Meet in the Middle" is a mid-tempo describing two people who learn how to "meet in the middle". In the first verse, they are friends who live far apart, and agree to meet at a tree between their houses. By the second verse, they are married (the ceremony taking place underneath said tree), and upon looking at the tree (now in their back yard), they are reminded to put their differences aside when they disagree.

The song features accompaniment from banjo and mandolin, with some Hammond organ flourishes.

Music video
This was their first music video and it was directed by Eric Straton and premiered in early 1991.

Legacy
Canadian country singer Brett Kissel sampled part of "Meet in the Middle" for his song "Slidin' Your Way" on his 2021 album What Is Life, calling the track "an ode to Diamond Rio".

Chart positions
"Meet in the Middle" peaked at number one on the Billboard Hot Country Singles & Tracks (now Hot Country Songs) charts in mid-1991, making Diamond Rio the first country music band in history to have its debut single reach Number One.

Year-end charts

Certifications

References

1991 debut singles
1991 songs
Diamond Rio songs
Songs written by Chapin Hartford
Songs written by Don Pfrimmer
Arista Nashville singles